{{DISPLAYTITLE:C7H16N2}}
The molecular formula C7H16N2 (molar mass: 128.22 g/mol, exact mass: 128.1313 u) may refer to:

 Cimemoxin, or cyclohexylmethohydrazine
 Hexamethylenediimine

Molecular formulas